Alexander Hegius von Heek (?1433/1439/1440?7 December 1498) was a German humanist, so called from his birthplace Heek (located near Ahaus, then in the Duchy of Westphalia).

Hegius learned, likely in Emmerich, Greek from Rodolphus Agricola. In 1474 he settled down at Deventer in the Netherlands, where he either founded or succeeded to the headship of a school, which became famous for the number of its distinguished alumni. First and foremost of these was Erasmus; others were Hermann von dem Busche and Murmellius, the missionaries of humanism, Conrad Goclenius (Gockelen), Conrad Mutianus (Muth von Mudt) and Frans van Cranevelt.

His writings, consisting of short poems, philosophical essays, grammatical notes and letters, were published after his death by his pupil Jacobus Faber. They display considerable knowledge of Latin, but less of Greek, on the value of which he strongly insisted.

Hegius's chief claim to be remembered rests not upon his published works, but upon his services in the cause of humanism. He succeeded in abolishing the old-fashioned medieval textbooks and methods of instruction, and led his pupils to the study of the classical authors themselves. His generosity in assisting poor students exhausted a considerable fortune, and at his death he left nothing but his books and clothes.

References

1430s births
1498 deaths
German Renaissance humanists
German Roman Catholics
People from Deventer